The 1958 Arizona gubernatorial election took place on November 4, 1958. Incumbent Governor Ernest McFarland decided not to run for reelection and instead unsuccessfully challenged U.S. Senator Barry Goldwater in attempt to return to the United States Senate.

Republican businessman Paul Fannin defeated Arizona Attorney General Robert Morrison in the general election, and was sworn into his first term as Governor on January 5, 1959, becoming Arizona's eleventh Governor.

Democratic primary

Candidates
 Robert Morrison, Attorney General of Arizona
 Dick Searles, real estate agent
 Marvin L. Burton

Results

Republican primary

Candidates
 Paul Fannin, businessman

General election

Results

References

1958
1958 United States gubernatorial elections
Gubernatorial
November 1958 events in the United States